Sushant University, formerly Ansal University (AU) and Ansal Institute of Technology (AIT), is a private university situated in Gurgaon, National Capital Region (NCR), India. It was established in 2012 through the Haryana Private Universities Act (Amendment) 2012, which also established MVN University and Baba Mastnath University. It was previously a private college affiliated with Guru Gobind Singh Indraprastha University, established in August 2000 under the Chiranjiv Charitable Trust. In 2020 it was renamed to its current name, under the Haryana Private Universities (Amendment) Act, 2020.

Location 

Sushant University is located in the foothills of Aravalli Range on the Golf Course Road with facilities on a  campus.

References

Private universities in India
Universities and colleges in Gurgaon
Universities in Haryana
Educational institutions established in 2012
2012 establishments in Haryana